Bremenfly GmbH was a German charter airline based in Schönefeld, Germany.

History
Bremenfly was founded in 2008, received its AOC on 15 April 2009 and started operations on 20 May of the same year, originally being based at Bremen Airport. The company was funded by Jordanian KH Group, along with Alexandria Airlines and Jordan Aviation, thus initially offering charter flights to Beirut and Amman out of several German airports.

In 2010 the Bremenfly headquarters were moved from Bremen to Berlin. On 3 November 2010, the airline returned its operating licence. Due to financial constraints, plans for a relaunch of operations could not be realized.

Destinations

During summer season 2010, Bremenfly operated charter flights to the following destinations:

Berlin - Berlin Schönefeld Airport Base
Düsseldorf - Düsseldorf Airport

Tel Aviv - Ben Gurion International Airport

Adana - Adana Airport
Gaziantep - Gaziantep Airport
Izmir - Izmir Airport
Kayseri - Kayseri Airport
Trabzon - Trabzon Airport

Fleet
The Bremenfly fleet consisted of two Boeing 737-400 aircraft, which were equipped with 168 passenger seats in an all-economy class cabin layout.

References

External links

Official website 
Official website  

Defunct airlines of Germany
Airlines established in 2008
Airlines disestablished in 2010
German companies established in 2008
German companies disestablished in 2010